In physics, the term total pressure may indicate two different quantities, both having the dimensions of a pressure:

For compressible flow the isentropic relations can be used (also valid for incompressible flow):
 

At standard conditions the scientific community usually takes  as the threshold to compressibility. Flows with a higher Mach number  cannot approximate the total pressure using the incompressible formula given above. At non-standard conditions the flow may be considered compressible at lower Mach numbers. An example would be a flow through a long insulated pipe where wall friction is not neglected. Then the flow's temperature increases farther down the pipe and must be considered compressible after some length. The higher the pressure and temperature are, the less good the incompressible formula becomes. At standard conditions and low Mach numbers it is very good and widely used.

Pressure
Fluid dynamics
Gases